Sonam Wangyal (born 1942) is a former Indian paramilitary personnel and mountaineer who climbed Mount Everest in 1965 at the age 23, making him the youngest summiter. He was one of the nine summiters of the first successful Indian Everest Expeditions that climbed Mount Everest in  May 1965 led by Captain M S Kohli,. He is the third Indian man, and eighteenth man in world, to have climbed Mount Everest. On 22 May 1965, the first time that the oldest (Sonam Gyatso at age 42) and the youngest (Sonam Wangyal at age 23) climbed Everest together.

Currently, he is serving as a principal at Sonam Gyatso Mountaineering Institute.

Honors and awards 
He was honoured with the Padma Shri in 1965, followed by the Arjuna Award in 1965 and then Tenzing Norgay National Adventure Award 2017 in lifetime achievement category. He served as the Principal of the Sonam Mountaineering Institute in Gangtok (Sikkim) from 1976 to 1990. He retired as Assistant Director of the Indo-Tibetan Border Police (ITBP) in 1993, and now lives in Leh.

References

See also 
Indian summiters of Mount Everest - Year wise
List of Mount Everest summiters by number of times to the summit
List of Mount Everest records of India
List of Mount Everest records

Indian summiters of Mount Everest
Indian mountain climbers
Recipients of the Padma Shri in sports
Recipients of the Arjuna Award
Indian military personnel
Mountain climbers from Jammu and Kashmir
People from Leh district
1942 births
Living people
Recipients of the Tenzing Norgay National Adventure Award